Tyszki-Bregendy  is a village in the administrative district of Gmina Szydłowo, within Mława County, Masovian Voivodeship, in east-central Poland.

The village has an approximate population of 70.

References

Tyszki-Bregendy